The 1985 Ball State Cardinals football team was an American football team that represented Ball State University in the Mid-American Conference (MAC) during the 1985 NCAA Division I-A football season. In its first season under head coach Paul Schudel, the team compiled a 4–7 record (3–6 against conference opponents) and finished in a three-way tie for sixth place out of ten teams in the MAC. The team played its home games at Ball State Stadium in Muncie, Indiana.

The team's statistical leaders included Wade Kosakowski with 1,614 passing yards, Carlton Campbell with 747 rushing yards, Deon Chester with 617 receiving yards, and John Diettrich with 87 points scored.

Schedule

References

Ball State
Ball State Cardinals football seasons
Ball State Cardinals football